Dicro Oy is a Finnish contract manufacturer of electronics, cable and electromechanical assemblies for various industrial, medical and telecommunication branch businesses. The company headquarters is in the municipality of Vihti in the town of Nummela, Finland. It was founded in 1987 and in 2001 opened a new manufacturing plant in Estonia. On February 13, 2006, Dicro bought out another Nummela based firm, RFI filter manufacturer named GE Procond Oy, until then part of General Electric. The new daughter company was renamed Procond Oy.

Procond Oy

The company Procond Oy is based in Nummela and manufactures industrial RFI and EMP filters.

These include:
 Power line filters
 RFI filters
 EMC filters
 EMP filters
 Rectifiers

References

External links
 

Electronics companies of Finland
Electronics companies established in 1987
Finnish companies established in 1987
Vihti